Fanaa in Sufism is the "passing away" or "annihilation" (of the self). Fana means "to die before one dies", a concept highlighted by famous notable Persian mystics such as Rumi and later by Sultan Bahoo. There is controversy around what Fana exactly is, with some Sufis defining it as the annihilation of the human ego before God, whereby the self becomes an instrument of God's plan in the world (Baqaa). Other Sufis interpret it as breaking down of the individual ego and a recognition of the fundamental unity of God, creation, and the individual self. Persons having entered this enlightened state are said to obtain awareness of an intrinsic unity (Tawhid) between Allah and all that exists, including the individual's mind. This second interpretation is condemned as heretical by orthodox Islam.

Views 
Similar to other Sufi doctrines, Fana is also based purely on first-party Islamic teachings. Specifically, the Quran says:

Fana as Vision 
Mystics such as Al-Junayd al-Baghdadi, Al-Ghazali and Al-Sarraj maintained that this ultimate goal of Sufism was the vision (mushahadah) of the divine.

Fana was defined by Abu Nasr as-Sarraj thus:

Al-Hujwiri states the following:

So according to these early Sufis, Fana was interpreted as a recognition of the will of God, or the abandonment of being conscious of ones self, replacing this with contemplation on God alone.

However, according to Al-Hujwiri, vision of the divine can not occur without hard work on the part of the seeker. Such vision is combined with "ilm al-yaqin" or knowledge of certainty. This station leads to "ayn al-yaqin" (vision of certainty) and then the station of "ma'rifah" (gnosis), until it one arrives at haqq al-yaqin (reality of certainty), the stage of the friends of God (Wali Allah). This stage of Haqq al-Yaqin is what Al-Ghazali expressed as fana' kulli and fana fi al-tawhid. For Al-Ghazali, as with Al-Junayd before him, this meant recognition of God as the sole agent of the Universe. However Fana fi al-Tawhid does not mean 'fusion', 'identification', 'incarnation' etc. Rather, for Al-Ghazali, God could not be known through speculation in the manner of the philosophers, nor through the claims of union brought by al-Bistami and al-Hallaj, rather God could be known through his self-unveiling (khasf) through the personal process of observation (mushahadah).

Al-Sarraj condemned the idea of incarnation and fusion (the unionist interpretation below):

This visionary interpretation has been qualified by some thinkers as a "moderate form of Islamic mysticism", whereas the next interpretation is considered an "extravagant form of mysticism".

Fana as Union 
Another interpretation is that of Fana as being united with the One or the Truth. The two famous exponents of this who contended that fana is total union (ittihad) were Al-Bistami and Al-Hallaj.

The interpretation of Fana ascribed to Jallaluddin Rumi is as follows:

In his book, Ain-ul-Faqr, Sultan Bahoo gives his interpretation of Fana:

Hossein Nasr insists that this interpretation is the highest spiritual truth.

This view is criticized as heretical by some orthodox Muslims.

Similar concept in Eastern Religions
The idea of Fanaa in Sufism has been compared to Samadhi in Hinduism and Buddhism.

See also
Baqaa
Yaqeen

References

Sufism
Mysticism